The Port Elizabeth tramway network formed part of the public transport system in Port Elizabeth, South Africa, for nearly 70 years until the end of the 1940s.

History
From , the network was converted to electrical power.

See also

History of Port Elizabeth
List of town tramway systems in Africa
Rail transport in South Africa

References

Notes

Further reading

External links

Passenger rail transport in South Africa
Port Elizabeth
Transport in Port Elizabeth
Port Elizabeth